Baghra is a town situated in the Charthawal Legislative Council of Muzaffarnagar District in Uttar Pradesh, India.

It is located 11.83 kilometres from the District headquarters at Muzaffarnagar, and is 440 kilometres from the state capital Lucknow. Baghra is the headquarters of the Baghra Mandal, the lowest administrative unit in Uttar Pradesh. The town was the centre of a Baniya Community which rule area principally in the 19th Century. Baghra is Worldwide popular because Dargah-E-Aaliya Babul Hawaiz is situated here and every year more than 2 Lakhs people reach here to get some virtue. It has a population of about 20,122 people living in around 2931 households.

Villages near Baghra include Saidpur Khurd (1.2 km), Alipurkhurd (2.5 km), Mandi (2.8 km), Jagaheri (3.2 km), Budinakhurd (3.5 km), Amirnagar (3.7 km) Narottampur (4.0 km) and Dhindhawali.

References 

Cities and towns in Muzaffarnagar district
Baloch diaspora